Tucheng District is a district in the southwestern part of New Taipei City, Taiwan.

History
On 26 June 1993, Tucheng was upgraded from rural township to a county-administered city of Taipei County. On 25 December 2010, Taipei County was upgraded to New Taipei special municipality and Tucheng became a district.

Education
 HungKuo Delin University of Technology
 New Taipei Industrial Vocational High School

Tourist attractions
 Taiwan Nougat Creativity Museum
 Tucheng Tung Blossom Park
 Lin Family Garden
 FE21 Mall
 Cape No. 7 shooting scene
 Tianshang Mountain Recreation Area: Tianshang Mountain raises to a height of 429.7 m. Originally named Neipo Mountain, this steep distinctive peak has been carved by the Xindian and Heng Rivers. Also known as 'Imperial' Mountain, it provides a scenic view. 
 Chengtian Chan Temple: The Buddhist Chengtian Temple is located on Qingyuan Mountain east of Tucheng. It is a popular pilgrimage destination on weekends. A shady access path to the temple features an array of old stone tablets.
 Tucheng Riverside Park
 Paulownia Park

Transportation

National Highway No. 3
Provincial Highway No. 3
Taipei Metro: Bannan line (Blue) Line [Haishan, Tucheng, Yongning, and Dingpu stations]
New Taipei Metro: Sanying line - Dingpu and Mazutian metro stations

See also
 New Taipei City

References

External links 

  
 Dingpu elementary school English website

Districts of New Taipei